William J. Driscoll, Jr. is a State Representative who represents the 7th Norfolk District in the Massachusetts House of Representatives. He represents the towns of Milton and Randolph. Driscoll serves as the Vice Chair of the Joint Committee on Election Laws, and on the House Committee on Post Audit and Oversight, the Joint Committee on Consumer Protection and Professional Licensure, and the Joint Committee on Health Care Financing.

See also
 2019–2020 Massachusetts legislature
 2021–2022 Massachusetts legislature

References

Living people
21st-century American politicians
Democratic Party members of the Massachusetts House of Representatives
Boston College alumni
People from Milton, Massachusetts
Year of birth missing (living people)